Ström House is a manor house at Lilla Edet Municipality in Bohuslän, Sweden. It is located west of the Göta River, in the parish of Hjärtum.

History
Between 1685–91, a manor house with built two wings and a slate roof. In the 1840s, the property was sold to  Asmus Heinrich Evers (1793-1877), a wholesaler who had immigrated from Lübeck, Germany. The manor house was demolished or burned down in 1851. The current main building was built in 1852 according to drawings by architect Edvard Medén (1825-1911).

In the 1980s, the manor was converted into a conference  and restaurant facility. After a bankruptcy in 1990, the  manor house underwent renovation. In 2007,  it reopened for use as a preschool and daycare center,  Ströms slott förskola.

References

Exterbak links
Ströms slott website

Buildings and structures in Bohuslän
Manor houses in Sweden
Education in Sweden